Varick is a hamlet in the Town of Varick, Seneca County, New York, United States near the former Seneca Army Depot along Reeder Creek. It is located nine miles (14 km) southeast of the City of Geneva, at an elevation of 604 feet (184 m). The primary intersection in the hamlet is at N.Y. Route 96A and Yale Farm Road (CR 127).

References

Hamlets in Seneca County, New York
Hamlets in New York (state)
Populated places in Seneca County, New York